Engytatus is a genus of plant bugs in the family Miridae. There are more than 20 described species in Engytatus.

Species
These 28 species belong to the genus Engytatus:

 Engytatus acuminatus (Knight, 1938)
 Engytatus affinis (Gagne, 1968)
 Engytatus andinus (Carvalho & Becker, 1958)
 Engytatus arida (Gagne, 1968)
 Engytatus aristidesi (Carvalho, 1975)
 Engytatus confusa (Perkins, 1912)
 Engytatus cyrtandrae (Gagné, 1969)
 Engytatus floreanae (Gagne, 1968)
 Engytatus gummiferae (Gagne, 1968)
 Engytatus hawaiiensis (Kirkaldy, 1902)
 Engytatus helleri (Gagne, 1968)
 Engytatus itatiaianus (Carvalho, 1980)
 Engytatus lacteus (Spinola, 1852)
 Engytatus lysimachiae (Carvalho & Usinger, 1960)
 Engytatus marquesanus (Knight, 1938)
 Engytatus minutus (Knight, 1938)
 Engytatus modestus (Distant, 1893) (tomato bug)
 Engytatus nicotianae (Koningsberger, 1903)
 Engytatus perplexa (Gagné, 1969)
 Engytatus phyllostegiae (Carvalho & Usinger, 1960)
 Engytatus quitoensis (Carvalho & Gomes, 1968)
 Engytatus rubescens (Distant, 1884)
 Engytatus seorsus (Van Duzee, 1934)
 Engytatus sidae (Gagné, 1969)
 Engytatus similaris (Carvalho, 1947)
 Engytatus terminalis (Gagné, 1969)
 Engytatus tuberculatus (Knight, 1938)
 Engytatus varians (Distant, 1884)

References

Further reading

External links

 

Miridae genera
Articles created by Qbugbot
Dicyphini